Moringa hildebrandtii, or Hildebrandt's moringa, is a tree species with a massive, water-storing trunk in the family Moringaceae. It is endemic to Madagascar, where it is extinct in the wild, but preserved by indigenous horticulture practices.

The plant originally was thought to grow along the west coast of Madagascar, but ethnobotany data suggest it in fact grew in the island's extreme southwest.

Description
The plant's water-storing trunk grows up to 20 m. Its leaves are pinnate, compound, and can reach 1 m long. The leaf rachis and stem tips of young plants are distinctively deep red. Leaves spread around the trunk in an umbrella-like fashion. The small ivory-white flowers are borne in large sprays. Fruits are up to 50 cm long and contain 6 to 12 large nut-shaped seeds in a hard, light brown shell.

Rediscovery
In an article in Cactus World (the quarterly journal of the British Cactus and Succulent Society) the authors claimed to have rediscovered a population of M. hildebrandtii in the wild.

References

External links
 Mnhn.fr: " Moringa hildebrandtii — a tree extinct in the wild"

hildebrandtii
Endemic flora of Madagascar
Trees of Madagascar
Taxa named by George Engelmann